Sedlar,  Седлар is a South Slavic surname. Notable people with the surname include:

 Aleksandar Sedlar (born 1991), Serbian football player
 Jakov Sedlar (born 1952), Croatian film director 
 Snežana Sedlar
 Zlatko Sedlar (born 1972), Croatian slalom canoeist

South Slavic-language surnames